Harriet Pattison is an American landscape architect.

Early life and education 
Pattison was born in Chicago, Illinois. She was the youngest of the seven children of William Lawrence and Bonnie Abbott.  She attended the Francis Parker School in Chicago. In 1951, she graduated with a B.A. from the University of Chicago. Pattison also studied acting at the Yale School of Drama and took graduate philosophy courses at the University of Edinburgh. After, she moved to Philadelphia to study piano under Edith Braun at the Curtis Institute of Music. In 1958, she met architect Louis Kahn. Kahn began a relationship with her and encouraged her study of landscape architecture.

Career 
Pattison's first landscape architecture apprenticeship was at the offices of modernist landscape architect Dan Kiley in Vermont. She received a MA in landscape architecture at the University of Pennsylvania in 1967, studying with Ian McHarg, Roberto Burle Marx, M. Paul Friedberg, and others. Pattison also designed a master plan for the  The Hershey Company headquarters.

After graduating from University of Pennsylvania, she joined the landscape architecture firm of George Patton. She collaborated with Louis Kahn on several projects. Together, they designed the Kimbell Art Museum and Four Freedoms Park on Roosevelt Island in New York City.

Selected projects 
 Franklin D. Roosevelt Four Freedoms Park
 Kimbell Art Museum
 The Hershey Company's headquarters

Personal life 
Her personal relationship with Louis Kahn is described in the 2003 documentary by their son, the film's director, Nathaniel Kahn, My Architect: A Son's Journey. In 2020, she published her and Louis Kahn's correspondences in Our Days Are Like Full Years: A Memoir with Letters from Louis Kahn (Yale University Press, 2020).

Awards and honors 
At age 87, Pattison became a fellow of the American Society of Landscape Architects (ASLA) in 2016.

Books 
Our Days Are Like Full Years: A Memoir with Letters from Louis Kahn (Yale University Press, 2020)

References

External links 
Harriet Pattison Oral History at The Cultural Landscape Foundation
Harriet Pattison Interview with Common Edge.

American landscape architects
University of Chicago alumni
University of Pennsylvania alumni
American landscape and garden designers
1928 births
Yale School of Drama alumni
Alumni of the University of Edinburgh
Living people

Francis W. Parker School (Chicago) alumni
American women architects
Women landscape architects